Redlands–Esri station is a rail station in Redlands, California. It is located north of the headquarters of the geographic information system company Esri (Environmental Systems Research Institute), who funded the station's construction. The station opened on October 24, 2022 and is served directly by the Arrow rail line. Metrolink's San Bernardino Line express trains to  utilize the main track, but do not stop at this station.

References

External links 

Railway stations in the United States opened in 2022
Public transportation in San Bernardino County, California
Redlands, California
Arrow stations